The 2010 Open Sud de France was a men's tennis tournament played on indoor hard courts. It was the 24th edition of the Open Sud de France, and was part of the World Tour 250 Series of the 2010 ATP World Tour. It was held at the Arena Montpellier in Montpellier, France, from 25 October through 31 October 2010. It was the first edition to be held under the new title and the first in Montpellier, after Lyon lost the tournament. The tournament marked the first time since 1993 that top level professional tennis was played in the city. Gaël Monfils won the singles title.

ATP entrants

Seeds

 Seeds are based on the rankings of October 18, 2010.

Other entrants
The following players received wildcards into the singles main draw:
  Nicolas Mahut
  David Nalbandian
  Benoît Paire

The following players received entry from the qualifying draw:
  Steve Darcis
  Romain Jouan
  Adrian Mannarino
  Mischa Zverev

Finals

Singles

 Gaël Monfils defeated  Ivan Ljubičić, 6–2, 5–7, 6–1
It was Monfils' 1st title of the year and 3rd of his career.

Doubles

 Stephen Huss /  Ross Hutchins defeated  Marc López /  Eduardo Schwank, 6–2, 4–6, [10–7]

External links
Official website